Albert Bruce (born 30 December 1993) is a Ghanaian professional footballer who plays as a midfielder for Greek Super League 2 club Panachaiki.

Club career
Bruce started his career with Power FC in Koforidua. He then moved to Berekum Arsenal before joining Asante Kotoko in July 2010. During his spell with the Porcupines, Bruce was loaned out to Polish club Legia Warsaw in a three-year deal, but was unable to command a starting place in the team, which resulted in his loan deal being terminated in December 2012.

Bruce continued to pursue a career abroad, undergoing trials with Maltese side Qormi before being offered a deal, earning Asante Kotoko a reported transfer fee of 50K Euros. He then moved to fellow Maltese club Naxxar Lions in January 2015, before signing a two-year contract with Maltese giants Valletta in the summer of 2015.

After spending several months sidelined due to injury, Bruce eventually signed a contract with Greek 2nd Division club Panegialios in February 2017. A year later, he released himself from his contract with the club and subsequently joined fellow Greek 2nd-tier club Ergotelis on a 1,5-year deal. His stellar performances with the club during the first half of the 2018–19 season reportedly drew interest from Greek reigning champions AEK.

In August 2020, Bruce was transferred from Ergotelis to fellow Super League 2 side Panachaiki for an undisclosed transfer fee.

Career statistics

Club

Notes

References

1993 births
Living people
Ghanaian footballers
Ghanaian expatriate footballers
Association football midfielders
Football League (Greece) players
Challenger Pro League players
Maltese Premier League players
Power F.C. players
Legia Warsaw players
Qormi F.C. players
Naxxar Lions F.C. players
Valletta F.C. players
Sliema Wanderers F.C. players
Panegialios F.C. players
Ergotelis F.C. players
Panachaiki F.C. players
Expatriate footballers in Poland
Ghanaian expatriate sportspeople in Poland
Expatriate footballers in Malta
Expatriate footballers in Greece
Ghanaian expatriate sportspeople in Greece